Howard Raymond Stafford  (24 March 1893 – 7 January 1942) was an Australian rules footballer who played with University in the Victorian Football League (VFL).

He later served in World War I, being awarded a Military Medal in 1917.

Sources

External links

1893 births
1942 deaths
Australian rules footballers from Victoria (Australia)
University Football Club players
People educated at Wesley College (Victoria)
Australian military personnel of World War I